Leonard Price Stavisky (September 11, 1925 – June 19, 1999) was an American university professor and politician from New York.

Life
He was born on September 11, 1925, in the Bronx, New York City. He graduated from City College of New York in 1945, and M.A. from Columbia University in 1946. Then he taught history and political science at several colleges and universities until 1979. He graduated with a Ph.D. in political science from Columbia University in 1958. In 1964, he married Toby Ann Goldhaar, and their only child is Evan M. Stavisky. They lived in Whitestone, Queens. From 1979 to 1990, he was an adjunct professor of political science at the School of International and Public Affairs, Columbia University.

He entered politics as a Democrat, and was a member of the New York City Council from 1954 to 1960.

He was a member of the New York State Assembly from 1966 to 1983, sitting in the 176th, 177th, 178th, 179th, 180th, 181st, 182nd, 183rd, 184th, and 185th New York State Legislatures. In 1969, he ran in the Democratic primary for Borough President of Queens but was defeated by Sidney Leviss.

On April 12, 1983, Stavisky was elected to the New York State Senate, filling in a vacancy caused by the election of Gary L. Ackerman to the U.S. Congress. He was re-elected several times, and remained in the State Senate until his death in 1999, sitting in the 185th, 186th, 187th, 188th, 189th, 190th, 191st, 192nd, and 193rd New York State Legislatures.

He died on June 19, 1999, in a hospital in Queens, after a succumbing to a cerebral hemorrhage.

References

1925 births
1999 deaths
People from the Bronx
People from Whitestone, Queens
Democratic Party members of the New York State Assembly
Democratic Party New York (state) state senators
City College of New York alumni
Columbia University alumni
Columbia University faculty
20th-century American politicians